The Grand Golliat (also spelled Grand Golliaz) is a mountain of the Pennine Alps, located between the Petit Col Ferret and the Great St. Bernard Pass. At 3,238 metres above sea level, its summit straddles the border between Switzerland and Italy, separating the Swiss canton of Valais from the Italian region of Aosta Valley. The name Golliat comes from "gouilles" or small lakes located on the Italian side of the mountain.

The Grand Golliat is the southernmost mountain rising above 3,000 metres in Switzerland.

References

External links
 Grand Golliat on Summitpost
 Grand Golliat on Hikr

Mountains of the Alps
Alpine three-thousanders
Mountains of Switzerland
Mountains of Italy
Italy–Switzerland border
Mountains of Valais